West of the Law is a 1926 American silent Western film directed by Ben F. Wilson and starring Wilson, Neva Gerber, Ashton Dearholt and Lafe McKee.

Cast
 Ben F. Wilson as John Adams 
 Neva Gerber as Alice Armstrong
 Ashton Dearholt as Frank Armsttrong
 Hal Walters as Dick Walton
 Cliff Lyons as Sheriff
 Lafe McKee as Jim Armstrong
 Al Ferguson as Surly Dorgan
 Myrna Thompson as Phyllis Parker

References

Bibliography
 Connelly, Robert B. The Silents: Silent Feature Films, 1910-36, Volume 40, Issue 2. December Press, 1998.
 Munden, Kenneth White. The American Film Institute Catalog of Motion Pictures Produced in the United States, Part 1. University of California Press, 1997.

External links
 

1926 films
1926 Western (genre) films
1920s English-language films
American silent feature films
Silent American Western (genre) films
American black-and-white films
Films directed by Ben F. Wilson
Rayart Pictures films
1920s American films